The International Gymnix is a major international annual gymnastics competition. It is held in Montreal, Canada, with a senior and a junior tournaments. It was organized for the first time in 1991. It is the largest international gymnastics competition of Canada. The tournament brings together some of the best gymnasts in the world, including the Canadian elite.

Many talents were launched in this competition, to which have taken part MyKayla Skinner, Ellie Black, Carly Patterson, Nina Derwael, Jordyn Wieber, Dominique Dawes, Aliya Mustafina, Oksana Chusovitina, Isabela Onyshko, Shawn Johnson, Bridget Sloan, Larisa Iordache, Lilia Podkopayeva, Lauren Mitchell, Angelina Melnikova, Sunisa Lee, among others.

Past editions

References

International gymnastics competitions hosted by Canada
Sports competitions in Montreal
Recurring sporting events established in 1991
1991 establishments in Canada